Combined arms is an approach to warfare that seeks to integrate different combat arms of a military to achieve mutually complementary effects—for example, using infantry and armour in an urban environment in which each supports the other).

According to the strategist William S. Lind, combined arms can be distinguished from the concept of "supporting arms" as follows:
Combined arms hits the enemy with two or more arms simultaneously in such a manner that the actions he must take to defend himself from one make him more vulnerable to another. In contrast, supporting arms is hitting the enemy with two or more arms in sequence, or if simultaneously, then in such combination that the actions the enemy must take to defend himself from one also defends himself from the other(s).

Though the lower-echelon units of a combined arms team may be of similar types, a balanced mixture of such units are combined into an effective higher-echelon unit, whether formally in a table of organization or informally in an ad hoc solution to a battlefield problem. For example, an armoured division, the modern paragon of combined arms doctrine, consists of a mixture of infantry, tank, artillery, reconnaissance, and helicopter units, all of which are co-ordinated and directed by a unified command structure.

Also, most modern military units can, if the situation requires it, call on yet more branches of the military, such as infantry requesting bombing or shelling by military aircraft or naval forces to augment their ground offensive or protect their land forces. The mixing of arms is sometimes pushed down below the level at which homogeneity ordinarily prevails, such as by temporarily attaching a tank company to an infantry battalion.

Ancient warfare
Combined arms operations date back to antiquity, where armies would usually field a screen of skirmishers to protect their spearmen during the approach to contact. Especially in the case of the Greek hoplites, however, the focus of military thinking lay almost exclusively on the heavy infantry. In more elaborate situations armies of various nationalities fielded different combinations of light, medium, or heavy infantry, cavalry, chariotry, camelry, elephantry, and artillery (mechanical weapons). Combined arms in this context was how to best use the cooperating units, variously armed with side-arms, spears, or missile weapons in order to coordinate an attack to disrupt and then destroy the enemy.

Philip II of Macedon greatly improved upon the limited combined arms tactics of the Greek city-states and combined the newly created Macedonian phalanx with heavy cavalry and other forces. The phalanx would hold the opposing line in place, until the heavy cavalry could smash and break the enemy line by achieving local superiority.

The pre-Marian Roman Legion was a combined arms force and consisted of five classes of troops. Lightly equipped velites acted as skirmishers armed with light javelins. The hastati and principes formed the main attacking strength of the legion with sword and pilum, whilst the triarii formed the defensive backbone of the legion fighting as a phalanx with long spears and large shields. The fifth class were the equites (the cavalry) used for scouting, pursuit and to guard the flanks.

After the Marian reforms the Legion was notionally a unit of heavy infantrymen armed with just sword and pilum, and fielded with a small attached auxiliary skirmishers and missile troops, and incorporated a small cavalry unit. The legion was sometimes also incorporated into a higher-echelon combined arms unit – e.g., in one period it was customary for a general to command two legions plus two similarly sized units of auxiliaries, lighter units useful as screens or for combat in rough terrain.

The army of the Han Dynasty is also an example, fielding mêlée infantry, crossbowmen, and cavalry (ranging from horse archers to heavy lancers).

Civilizations such as the Carthaginians and Sassanids also were known to have fielded a combination of infantry supported by powerful cavalry.

Middle Ages
At the Battle of Hastings (1066) English infantry fighting from behind a shield wall were defeated by a Norman army consisting of archers, foot soldiers (infantry), and mounted knights (cavalry). One of the tactics used by the Normans was to tempt the English to leave the shield wall to attack retreating Norman infantry only to destroy them in the open with cavalry. Likewise Scottish sheltrons – which had been developed to counter the charges by English heavy cavalry, and had been used successfully against English cavalry at the Battle of Stirling Bridge (1297) – were destroyed at the Battle of Falkirk (1298) by English archers acting in concert with mounted knights. Both Hastings and Falkirk showed how combined arms could be used to defeat enemies relying on only one arm.

The English victories of Crécy, Poitiers and Agincourt were examples of a simple form of combined arms, with a combination of dismounted knights forming a foundation for formations of English longbowmen. The lightly protected longbowmen could down their French opponents at a distance, whilst the armoured men-at-arms could deal with any Frenchmen who made it to the English lines. This is the crux of combined arms: to allow a combination of forces to achieve what would be impossible for its constituent elements to do alone.

During the Middle Ages military forces used combined arms as a method of winning battles and furthering a war leader or king's long term goals. Some historians claim that during the Middle Ages there was no strategic or tactical art to military combat. Kelly DeVries uses the Merriam-Webster definition of combat "as a general military engagement". In the pursuit of a leader's goals and self-interest tactical and strategic thinking was used along with taking advantage of the terrain and weather in choosing when and where to give battle. The simplest example is the combination of different specialties such as archers, infantry, cavalry (knights or shock mounted troops), and even peasant militia. At times, each force fought on its own and won or lost depending on the opposing military competence. During the Middle Ages leaders utilized a combination of these skilled and unskilled forces to win battles. An army that has multiple skills available can engage a larger force that incorporates mainly one or two types of troops. 

Each type of military formation – infantry, archers, cavalry, or peasants – has certain advantages that the other does not have. Infantry allows a force to hold ground and in the event of overwhelming enemy forces withdraw into terrain that mounted troops cannot maneuver as easily, thus negating the advantage of the horse. Archers provide standoff with their bows or crossbows. Cavalry can maneuver faster and provide fast attack before the enemy has had time to prepare defenses. Peasants are more numerous and cheaper on the royal coffers. Over the long term the army can cross-train and learn the skills of the specialties to increase combat effectiveness. This is known as a combat multiplier today. The combination of the different skills help provide a commander the flexibility to minimize risk when it comes to engagements. The overall objective of any military force is to fight and win, while also preserving the largest number of combatants to carry on the larger strategic aims of the king. This can be seen in some of the engagements during the Middle Ages.

Examples of combined arms use in battle
The effective use of combined arms can – in conjunction with strategic and tactical considerations – overwhelm opposing forces, even those which are numerically superior. The use of terrain and weather can also aid in the use of combined arms to bring about the desired results of the commander of a military force.

Crecy-en-Ponthieu
Mid-1346, at the battle of Crecy-en-Ponthieu, an English army numbering between 3,000–20,000 mixed troops set up a defensive line for the oncoming French forces numbering nearly 100,000 mixed troops. The English being in a defensive position dismounted their knights to augment the infantry forces on the lines of defense. The location of the English archers is unclear from the sources – either on the flanks, intermingled with the line troops, or behind the lines. But in the most likely scenario, they were formed up along the flanks according to prior positions in previous battles. The French arrived on the battlefield and sent their crossbowmen in advance of the cavalry to assault the English lines. The effectiveness of the crossbowmen was limited by rain having soaked the strings of the crossbows, reducing their effectiveness. The English archers had been able to keep their bow strings dry and only used them when the crossbowmen were in range. This led to the massacre of the crossbowmen and a retreat of the survivors, who were then trampled by the advancing French cavalry. This also disrupted an already disorganized advance after a long march to the battlefield by the cavalry. The piecemeal assault of the French forces would lead to an English victory.

Battle of Morgarten
In 1315, Swiss peasants, archers, and infantry at Morgarten were able to ambush a larger Austrian force. The Swiss had rebelled against Austrian rule and funneled the Austrian forces into easily defended passes in the Swiss mountains. The peasants and archers on the high ground effectively rained down arrows and rocks to disorganize the Austrian forces and the infantry charged in forcing the advance guard to retreat into the main body causing more confusion, as well as a general military retreat by the Austrian military.

Battle of Auberoche
In 1345, an English army of about 1,200 men had been moving through the Périgord region of Gascony. The French army had caught up outside the town of Auberoche but did not know the English had hidden in the woods near where the French had encamped upon arrival. During the evening meal the French were surprised by an attack under the cover of English archers. The disorganized French forces were slaughtered and had no choice but to withdraw.

15th to 19th centuries
Generally the savanna cavalries of West Africa used a combined arms approach, seldom operating without supporting infantry.

The French army of the Valois kings, composed of heavily armoured gendarmes (professional versions of the medieval knight), Swiss and Landsknecht mercenary pikemen, and heavy cannons took form during the transition from the medieval way of war to the early modern period.

The late 15th century saw the development of combined pike and shot formations in Europe, starting with the colunelas of the Spanish general Gonzalo Fernández de Córdoba, evolving into the tercios of Hapsburg Spain and the Imperial Army of the Holy Roman Empire during the 16th century.

In Japan, at the battle of Nagashino (長篠の戦い) in 1575, forces of the Oda clan successfully employed combined arms against the Takeda clan, which heavily relied on cavalry. The Oda army erected palisades to protect their ashigaru musketeers that shot down the Takeda cavalry while their samurai cut down any enemies who managed to approach melee range.

The 17th century saw increasing use of combined arms at lower (regimental) level. King Gustavus Adolphus of Sweden was the proponent of the idea. For fire support he attached teams of "commanded musketeers" to cavalry units and fielded light 3-pounder guns to provide infantry units with organic artillery.

In the eighteenth century, the concept of the legion was revived. Legions now consisted of musketeers, light infantry, dragoons and artillery in a brigade sized force. These legions often combined professional military personnel with militia. Perhaps the most notable example is the use of light cavalry, light infantry and light horse artillery in advance detachments by France's La Grande Armée during the Napoleonic Wars.

Napoleonic Wars
After 25 years of near continuous warfare, the armies that met at the Battle of Waterloo were organised in a similar manner – into corps which contained infantry, cavalry and artillery (see Order of battle of the Waterloo Campaign), and used similar combined arms tactics. Within each corps were divisions of infantry or cavalry made up of brigades and an artillery unit. An army would usually also have reserves of all three arms under the direct command of the army commander which could be sent in support of any corps or division of a corps to increase any arm which the army general considered necessary. The great French cavalry charge commanded by Marshal Ney during the battle failed to break Wellington's squares of infantry and Ney's failure to supplement his cavalry with sufficient horse artillery to break the squares open is usually given as a major contributing factor in the failure. It is an example of why generals needed to use combined arms to overcome the tactics used by enemy officers to frustrate an attack by a single arm of an army.

In contrast the 27th (Inniskilling) suffered 478 casualties from an initial strength of 750 because of their exposure to attack by French combined arms. They were located near the centre of Wellington's line, but unlike most of the rest of Wellington's infantry were in a declivity on the exposed side of the Mont-Saint-Jean escarpment. Exposed as they were, they were forced to stand in square for most of the day for fear of cavalry attack and so made an easy dense target for Napoleon's massed artillery.

20th-century developments

First World War
The development of modern combined arms tactics began in the First World War. Early in the Western Front, fighting descended into stagnant trench warfare. Generals on both sides applied conventional military thinking to the new weapons and situations that they faced. In these early stages, tactics typically consisted of heavy artillery barrages followed by massed frontal assaults against well entrenched enemies. These tactics were largely unsuccessful and resulted in large loss of life.

As the war progressed new combined arms tactics were developed, often described then as the "all arms battle". These included direct close artillery fire support for attacking soldiers (the creeping barrage), air support and mutual support of tanks and infantry. One of the first instances of combined arms was the Battle of Cambrai, in which the British used tanks, artillery, infantry, small arms and air power to break through enemy lines. Previously such a battle would have lasted months with many hundreds of thousands of casualties. Co-ordination and planning were the key elements, and the use of combined arms tactics in the Hundred Days Offensive in 1918 allowed the Allied forces to exploit breakthroughs in the enemy trenches, forcing the surrender of the Central Powers.

Second World War
In World War II combined arms was a fundamental part of some operational doctrines like Heinz Guderian's Blitzkrieg, or the Soviet deep battle doctrine, which was based on combining tanks, mobile units (mechanised infantry or cavalry) and infantry, while supported by artillery.

Cold War years
In 1963 the United States Marine Corps formalized the concept of the Marine Air-Ground Task Force, which combined Marine aviation and Marine ground units for expeditionary missions.

The Vietnam War had a profound influence on the development of the US Army's combined arms doctrine. Due to the very difficult terrain that prevented access to the enemy-held areas of operation, troops were often deployed by air assault. For this reason, US troops in Vietnam saw six times more combat than in preceding wars, due to less time spent on logistic delays. The result: an infantry unit increased in effectiveness by a factor of four for its size, when supported with helicopter-delivered ammunition, food and fuel. In time the US Army in Vietnam also learned to combine helicopter operations and airmobile infantry with the armoured and artillery units operating from fire support bases as well as the US brown-water navy and USAF close air support units supporting them.

AirLand Battle was the overall conceptual framework that formed the basis of the US Army's European warfighting doctrine from 1982 into the late 1990s. AirLand Battle emphasized close coordination between land forces acting as an aggressively maneuvering defense, and air forces attacking rear-echelon forces feeding those front line enemy forces.

In the 1991 Gulf War, General Schwarzkopf used a mix of strikes by fixed-wing aircraft including carpet bombing and precision bombing in combination with large numbers of strikes by attack helicopters. During the ground assault phase, tanks and other armoured fighting vehicles supported by attack aircraft swept over remaining forces. The front line moved forward at upwards of 40–50 km/h at the upper limit of the Army's tracked vehicles.

Post Cold War (1992–present)

In 2000, the US Army began developing a new set of doctrines intended to use information superiority to wage warfare. Six pieces of equipment were crucial for this: AWACS, an airborne look-down radar JSTARS, GPS, the lowly SINCGARS VHF digital radio, and ruggedized PCs. The mix is supplemented by satellite photos and passive reception of enemy radio emissions, forward observers with digital target designation, specialized scouting aircraft, anti-artillery radars and gun-laying software for artillery. Everything feeds into the network.

Based on this doctrine, many US ground vehicles moved across the landscape alone. If they encountered an enemy troop or vehicle concentration, they would assume a defensive posture, lay down as much covering fire as they could, designate the targets for requested air and artillery assets. Within a few minutes, on station aircraft would direct their missions to cover the ground vehicle. Within a half-hour heavy attack forces would concentrate to relieve the isolated vehicle. In an hour and a half the relieved vehicle would be resupplied.

See also
 Joint warfare
 Battlegroup (army)
 Organic unit
 Network-centric warfare

References

Bibliography 
Thornton, John Kelly (1999). Warfare in Atlantic Africa, 1500–1800. Routledge.

Further reading
 
 

Armoured warfare
Warfare post-1945
Warfare by type